Brooke McCarter (April 22, 1963 – December 22, 2015) was an American actor, producer, director, composer and musician. He is known for the role of Paul in the 1987 vampire horror comedy The Lost Boys.

Background
McCarter was born in Bryn Mawr, Pennsylvania, the son of Maria and Brooke McCarter. Brooke was born with athletic and musical talent.  Sponsored by Ektelon, Brooke won dozens of trophies, was second in the state of Ohio for the Under 18 division, and earned a racquetball scholarship to Memphis State University.  He spent two years in Memphis and one year at Ohio University.

After winning a modeling contest, Brooke was signed to the Ford modeling agency and moved to New York City, where he studied with acting coach icon Stella Adler and recorded music in the studio. Upon moving to Los Angeles, he made his acting debut in the 1986 skater drama Thrashin'. During the filming of The Lost Boys, McCarter became friends with his co-star Corey Haim and became his manager through the 1990s. After having a small part in the John Belushi biographical film Wired (1989), he went on a hiatus from acting to focus on other projects. As a composer, he scored the film Fast Getaway (1991) and the documentary Leaves of Green (2002), which he also directed. He returned to acting in 2009 in Herschell Gordon Lewis's The Uh-Oh! Show.

Career
McCarter appeared in such films as Thrashin' in 1986, Wired in 1989, The Uh-oh Show in 2009, and the 1980s television reboot series The Twilight Zone. McCarter began his career in the entertainment industry as a model with the Ford modeling agency in New York City after winning a national talent search. He soon began doing major campaigns for companies such as Levi's and JC Penney. He engaged in a performing arts curriculum of voice, dance and acting. He then studied with acting coach icon Stella Adler. Upon completing his New York education, he moved to Los Angeles and began working on national commercials for major products such as Pepsi, Miller and Chevrolet. 

McCarter found his first feature film, Thrashin, a skateboard movie which also featured Tony Hawk, Josh Brolin and the Red Hot Chili Peppers. His first big break came with a co-starring role in the '80s vampire hit The Lost Boys. McCarter appeared in  TV shows such as The Twilight Zone and Route 66. His last feature film was Wired, about the life of John Belushi starring Michael Chiklis. 

He was also a drummer and music programmer, and scored independent feature films such as Fast Getaway and documentaries such as Leaves of Green, on which he also served as director.

In 1998, he took a ten-year hiatus from Hollywood to work in the telecommunications industry. During this time he moved to Tampa, Florida, to raise his daughter as a single dad. In 2009, McCarter returned to acting with the lead role in horror icon Herschell Gordon Lewis's Uh-Oh Show. In recent years he toured horror conventions throughout the U.S. and abroad with his Lost Boys'' co-stars. He also toured the U.S. as a drummer and could be seen in venues throughout the Tampa Bay area hand drumming with his djembes, bongos, congas and tambourines.

Death
McCarter died in Tampa, Florida on December 22, 2015, at the age of 52 from the genetic liver disorder alpha 1-antitrypsin deficiency (AAT). His death increased awareness of this rare disorder, according to the Alpha-1 Foundation.

Filmography

Film

Television

Video games

References

External links
 

1963 births
2015 deaths
Male actors from Philadelphia
American male film actors
American male television actors
20th-century American male actors
21st-century American male actors
Deaths from liver disease